Out the Blue may refer to:

 "Out the Blue" (John Lennon song), 1973
 "Out the Blue" (Sub Focus song), 2012
 "Out the Blue", a song by Roll Deep from Winner Stays On

See also
 Out of the Blue (disambiguation)